Peterhead Rugby Football Club is a rugby union team in Peterhead, Aberdeenshire.

History
Peterhead RFC was started in 1984 in the Scottish town of Peterhead and is one of the youngest clubs in the North-East of Scotland.

Current status

Location
Peterhead play at the Lord Catto playing fields, near to the Balmoor stadium of Peterhead F.C., and have a capacity for about 400 standing spectators.

References

Scottish rugby union teams
Rugby clubs established in 1984
Sport in Peterhead
Rugby union in Aberdeenshire